Lara Maritz (born 7 January 2001) is a South African-born Irish cricketer. She made her Women's One Day International cricket (WODI) debut against India in the 2017 South Africa Quadrangular Series on 7 May 2017. She made her Women's Twenty20 International cricket (WT20I) debut for Ireland against New Zealand Women on 6 June 2018. She plays in the Women's Super Series for Scorchers.

In June 2018, she was named in Ireland's squad for the 2018 ICC Women's World Twenty20 Qualifier tournament. In October 2018, she was named in Ireland's squad for the 2018 ICC Women's World Twenty20 tournament in the West Indies. In August 2019, she was named in Ireland's squad for the 2019 ICC Women's World Twenty20 Qualifier tournament in Scotland. In October 2019, she was named in the Women's Global Development Squad, ahead of a five-match series in Australia. In July 2020, she was awarded a non-retainer contract by Cricket Ireland for the following year.

References

External links
 
 

2001 births
Living people
Cricketers from Pretoria
South African emigrants to Ireland
Irish women cricketers
Ireland women One Day International cricketers
Ireland women Twenty20 International cricketers
Scorchers (women's cricket) cricketers
Dragons (women's cricket) cricketers